Elachista carcharota is a moth of the family Elachistidae. It is found in Victoria, South Australia and Western Australia.

The forewings are pale grey. The hindwings are grey.

The larvae feed on Lepidosperma concavum and possibly Lepidosperma congestum. They mine the leaves of their host plant. Young larvae mine upwards, creating a straight and narrow initial stage of the mine. Later, the mine slowly widens and turns downwards. The whole mine, except the last , is filled with frass. Pupation takes place outside of the mine on a leaf of the host plant.

References

Moths described in 2011
Endemic fauna of Australia
carcharota
Moths of Australia
Taxa named by Lauri Kaila